Sławianowo  (German Slawianowo, 1939–1945 Steinmark) is a village in the administrative district of Gmina Złotów, within Złotów County, Greater Poland Voivodeship, in west-central Poland.

The village has a population of 410.

References

Villages in Złotów County